Anne König (born 4 December 1984) is a German politician for the Christian Democratic Union and since 2021 member of the Bundestag, the federal diet.

Life and politics 

König was born 1984 in the West German city of Münster and was elected directly to the Bundestag in 2021.

References 

Living people
1984 births
Christian Democratic Union of Germany politicians
Members of the Bundestag 2021–2025
21st-century German politicians
21st-century German women politicians
Female members of the Bundestag